Senator Thomson may refer to:

Edward Hughes Thomson (1810–1886), Michigan State Senate
John Renshaw Thomson (1800–1862), U.S. Senator from New Jersey from 1853 to 1862
John Thomson (Ohio politician) (1780–1852), Ohio State Senate
Manlius Valerius Thomson (1802–1850), Kentucky State Senate

See also
Senator Thompson (disambiguation)
Hugh French Thomason (1826–1893), Arkansas State Senate
Chuck Thomsen (born 1957), Oregon State Senate